Paul Halford is a former association football player who represented New Zealand at international level.

He was a star player for Napier City Rovers, scoring a goal in their 1985 Chatham Cup final success, in the 1980s before joining the Brisbane Lions. He returned to Napier City Rovers in 1991 helping the club to more success.

Halford made his All Whites debut on 9 June at Auckland, Mt Smart Stadium in an unofficial friendly against Glasgow Rangers. He scored in his first A-international, a 7-0 win over Western Samoa on 7 November 1987 and went on to represent the New Zealand national football team making 7 A-international appearances between 1987 and 1988, scoring three goals in all.

In 1993, Halford was awarded New Zealand soccer player of the year and players' player of the year, and he again was awarded the latter in 1996.

Honours

Napier City Rovers 

 New Zealand National Soccer League: 1993, 1998, 2000

 Chatham Cup: 1985, 1993, 2000

Southport Warriors 

 Gold Coast League Premiership: 1989, 1990
 Gold Coast League Championship: 1989, 1990

Individual 

 Jack Batty Memorial Cup: 1993
 Gold Coast League Golden Boot: 1989

References 

Living people
New Zealand association footballers
New Zealand international footballers
Napier City Rovers FC players
Association football midfielders
Year of birth missing (living people)